Teseo de Cupis or Teseo de Cuppis (died 1528) was a Roman Catholic prelate who served as Bishop of Macerata (1507–1528)
and Bishop of Recanati (1507–1516).

Biography
On 20 October 1507, Teseo de Cupis was appointed during the papacy of Pope Julius II as Bishop of Macerata and Bishop of Recanati.
On 16 January 1516, he resigned as Bishop of Recanati. 
He served as Bishop of Macerata until his death in 1528.

References

External links and additional sources
 (for Chronology of Bishops) 
 (for Chronology of Bishops) 
 (for Chronology of Bishops) 
 (for Chronology of Bishops) 

16th-century Italian Roman Catholic bishops
Bishops appointed by Pope Julius II
1528 deaths